The 2004 Kentucky Wildcats football team represented the University of Kentucky during the 2004 NCAA Division I-A football season. The team participated as members of the Southeastern Conference in the Eastern Division. They played their home games at Commonwealth Stadium in Lexington, Kentucky. The team was coached by Rich Brooks.

Offensive coordinator Ron Hudson resigned prior to the last game of the season against Tennessee. Wide receivers coach Joker Phillips took over play calling duties as the Wildcats nearly upset the 15th ranked Volunteers.

Schedule

References

Kentucky
Kentucky Wildcats football seasons
Kentucky Wildcats football